is a Japanese sailor. She competed at the 1988 Summer Olympics and the 1996 Summer Olympics.

References

External links
 
 

1958 births
Living people
Japanese female sailors (sport)
Olympic sailors of Japan
Sailors at the 1988 Summer Olympics – 470
Sailors at the 1996 Summer Olympics – Europe
Asian Games silver medalists for Japan
Asian Games medalists in sailing
Sailors at the 1998 Asian Games
Medalists at the 1998 Asian Games
Sportspeople from Tokyo